Michael Lowery (born February 14, 1974) is a former American football linebacker. He played for the Chicago Bears from 1996 to 1997.

References

1974 births
Living people
American football linebackers
Ole Miss Rebels football players
Chicago Bears players
Rhein Fire players